Miniopterus pallidus, the pale bent-wing bat, is a species of bat found in Middle-East. Until 2010, it was considered as a sub-species of M. schreibersii.

Range and habitat

The species was clearly identified in Turkey, but Miniopterus schreibersii pallidus was also recorded in others countries in the Middle East, Caucasus, Iran, Afghanistan and Pakistan.

So far, the species was only recorded in caves, but it is possible that different type of underground roosts are used by this species during the year, as for Miniopterus schreibersii.

Conservation
This species is listed in the Berne Convention and is specifically targeted by the UNEP-EUROBATS convention.

References

Literature cited
 Bilgin, R., Gürün, K., Maraci, Ö., Furman, A., Hulva, P., Çoraman, E., Radekk, L., Bartonick, T., & Horáček, I. 2012. Syntopic occurrence in Turkey supports separate species status for Miniopterus schreibersii schreibersii and M. schreibersii pallidus (Mammalia: Chiroptera). Acta Chiropterologica, 14(2), 279-289.
 Furman, A., Postawa, T., Öztunç, T., & Çoraman, E. 2010. Cryptic diversity of the bent-wing bat, Miniopterus schreibersii (Chiroptera: Vespertilionidae), in Asia Minor. BMC evolutionary biology, 10(1), 121.
 Postawa, T., & Furman, A. 2014. Abundance patterns of ectoparasites infesting different populations of Miniopterus species in their contact zone in Asia Minor. Acta Chiropterologica, 16(2), 387-395.

Miniopteridae
Bats of Europe
Taxa named by Oldfield Thomas
Mammals described in 1907